Norðfjörður Airport  is an airport serving Neskaupstaður, Iceland. The town is on the Norðfjörður fjord.

The Nordfjordur non-directional beacon (Ident: NF) is located on the field.

Statistics

Passengers and movements

See also 
 Transport in Iceland
 List of airports in Iceland

Notes

References 

 Google Earth

External links 
 OurAirports - Norðfjörður
 Norðfjörður Airport
 OpenStreetMap - Norðfjörður

Airports in Iceland